Botella may refer to:

Ana Botella (born 1953), Spanish politician
Félix Mantilla Botella (born 1974), Spanish tennis player
Juan Botella (1941-1970), Mexican diver
Monic Cecconi-Botella (born 1936), French pianist, music educator and composer
Salvador Botella (1929-2006), Spanish road bicycle racer